Antenore Cuel (27 March 1922 – 22 February 2018) was an Italian cross-country skier who competed in the 1950s.

Biography
He participated in the demonstration event, military patrol (precursor to biathlon), in the 1948 Winter Olympics, when he had the military rank Alpino. Competing at the 1952 Winter Olympics in Oslo, he finished 19th in the 50 km event. Also in 1952 he placed first at the Italian masterships of  cross-country skiing in the 50 km (and long distances) category. Cuel died in February 2018 at the age of 95.

References

External links
Olympic 50 km cross country skiing results: 1948-64
Cuel Antenore (Italian), fondoitalia

1922 births
2018 deaths
Alpini
Cross-country skiers at the 1952 Winter Olympics
Italian male cross-country skiers
Italian military patrol (sport) runners
Military patrol competitors at the 1948 Winter Olympics
Olympic cross-country skiers of Italy